Sinë, is a small village in the Dibër County, in Albania. After the 2015 local government reforms, it became part of the municipality Dibër.

History
Pal Kastrioti (fl. 1383—1407) was given village of Sina (Signa) as a fief by Zetan lord Balša II. Pal's son, Konstantin, was the lord of Serina (Sina, or Cerüja).

The settlements of Setina e Sipërme and Setina e Poshtme are attested in the Ottoman defter of 1467 as villages belonging to the timar of Karagöz in the vilayet of Lower Dibra. Both villages had a total of three households respectively and the anthroponymy recorded depicts an overwhelmingly Albanian character, although a single instance of Slavicisation via the usage of the suffix -ovići is attested in the latter settlement. From Setina e Sipërme: Gjon Vlashi, Gjon Niqifori, and Vlash Bilashi. From Setina e Poshtme: Dimitri Kastrijoti, Pal Pirovići, and Kolë Prifti.

Notable people
Skanderbeg, national hero of Albania

References

Populated places in Dibër (municipality)
Villages in Dibër County